Md Jubayer Salehin SUP, ndu, psc is a Major General of the Bangladesh Army and incumbent Engineer-in-Chief at the Bangladesh Army. Earlier, he was Commandant of Defence Services Command and Staff College (DSCSC) since 24 January 2021. Prior to Join DSCSC, Salehin commanded 17th Infantry Division as its General Officer Commanding and, served Sylhet Area as its Area Commander.

Career 
After completion of SSC and HSC from Cumilla Cadet College he join Bangladesh Army. Then he got commissioned in the Corps of Engineers of Bangladesh Army on 23 December 1988 with 19th Bangladesh Military Academy (BMA) Long Course. As a Brigadier General, he commanded an Engineer Construction Brigade involved in National Infrastructure Development and, an Infantry Brigade deployed in counter insurgency role in Chittagong Hill Tracts. He also served as the Chief Engineer of Dhaka City Corporation. He is the current governing body member of National Defence College and Bangladesh Public Administration Training Centre. On 24 Aug 2021, He led a delegation for a joint warfare workshop has been conduct with Sri Lankan Army. He later met with Chief of Defence Staff and Commander of the Sri Lanka Army General Shavendra Silva WWV RWP RSP VSV USP ndc psc and Commandant of DSCSC, Sri Lanka Major General Nishantha Herath RSP USP psc. Major General Salehin has been awarded the Army Excellence Medal (SUP) for his extraordinary service in Army.

Family 
Jubayer Salehin is happily married to Samia diwan. He is a father of two daughters. Salehin's father, Professor Ansar Ali was the principal of Chuadanga Government College and Darsana Govt. College.

References 

Bangladesh Army generals
Bangladesh University of Engineering and Technology alumni
Living people
Bangladeshi generals
Engineers in Chief of the Bangladesh Army
1970 births